Lincoln Arthur Winstone Efford (4 August 1907 – 24 April 1962) was a New Zealand pacifist, social reformer and adult educationalist. He was born in Christchurch, New Zealand, on 4 August 1907.

References

1907 births
1962 deaths
New Zealand educators
New Zealand activists
New Zealand pacifists